Under the Spell of Silence (German: Im Banne des Schweigens) is a 1916 German silent film directed by Hanna Henning and starring Olga Engl and Reinhold Schünzel.

Cast
 Olga Engl
 Reinhold Schünzel
 May Henkel
 Fritz Junkermann
 Olaf Roemer as Bubi 
 Joseph Römer as Bubi

References

Bibliography
 Bock, Hans-Michael & Bergfelder, Tim. The Concise CineGraph. Encyclopedia of German Cinema. Berghahn Books, 2009.

External links

1916 films
Films of the German Empire
German silent feature films
Films directed by Hanna Henning
German black-and-white films
1910s German films